Pathological jealousy, also known as morbid jealousy, Othello syndrome or delusional jealousy, is a psychological disorder in which a person is preoccupied with the thought that their spouse or sexual partner is being unfaithful without having any real proof, along with socially unacceptable or abnormal behaviour related to these thoughts. The most common cited forms of psychopathology in morbid jealousy are delusions and obsessions. It is considered a subtype of delusional disorder.

Overvaluing an idea, which is defined as “an acceptable, comprehensible idea pursued by the patient beyond the bounds of reason. The idea is not resisted and, although it is not a delusion, the patient characteristically attaches utmost importance to investigating and maintaining the partner’s fidelity at great personal disadvantage and to the distress of the partner”. Overvalued ideas are characterized by being existent in the individual's own thoughts, being egosyntonic; meaning that the ideas project the behaviors, values, and feelings that are aligned with the desires and aims of the individual's ego, or consistent with the individual's ideal self-image, the ideas are also amenable to reason but are not resisted.

Definition
This disorder occurs when a person typically makes repeated accusations that their spouse or sexual partner is being unfaithful, based on insignificant, minimal, or no evidence, often citing seemingly normal or everyday events or material to back up their claims.

Unlike other delusional disorders, people who suffer from this disorder have a strong association with stalking, cyberstalking, sabotage, or even violence. It can be found in the context of schizophrenia and delusional disorder, such as bipolar disorder, but is also associated with alcoholism and sexual dysfunction and has been reported after neurological illness (i.e. Parkinson's).

The name "Othello Syndrome" comes from the character in Shakespeare's play Othello, who murders his wife as a result of a false belief that she has been unfaithful. Recently, some psychologists and psychiatrists have asserted that Othello was deceived rather than deluded about Desdemona's alleged infidelity and thus did not have ‘the Othello Syndrome’.

Psychiatric history
 Presenting difficulties: neurotic or psychotic jealousy
 Past psychiatric history: neurotic or psychotic disorders, deliberate self-harm and attempted suicide
 Family history: mental illness including pathological jealousy
 Relationship history: incorporating both the current and previous relationship and taking account of the quality of the relationships and the difficulties experienced
 Forensic history: previous and pending charges and convictions as well as deviant behavior which was not reported or did not result in a charge or conviction (including aggressive behavior and stalking)
 Medical history: organic causes which may be responsible for the morbid jealousy (i.e. Parkinson's)

Forms
Obsessions: the individual's own thoughts are egodystonic; they are acknowledged to be senseless, and usually resisted. Jealous thoughts are experienced as intrusive and excessive, and compulsive behavior such as checking up on their partner may follow.  Egodystonicity (the distress caused by thoughts that are unwanted and viewed as contrary to conscious wishes) generally varies a large amount between patients and “a continuum from obsessional to delusional, which morbid jealousy has been suggested” (Insel & Akiskal 1986).
Extreme obsessions: much time is taken up by jealous concerns, and there is a great difficulty in putting the concerns out of the mind. Impairment of the relationship, limitation of the partner's freedom and checking on the partner's behavior may occur. Although a distinction was occasionally difficult to make, the categories of ‘psychotic’ (delusional) and ‘neurotic’ jealousy contained similar proportions (each between one-third and one-half).
Delusions: the individual's own thoughts are egosyntonic; they are regarded as true, and not resisted. Some authors compare morbid jealousy to a delusional state (e.g. Enoch & Trethowan, 1979). Beliefs may include the morbidly jealous subjects' suspicion that: 1. he or she is being poisoned or given some substance(s) to decrease sexual potency by the partner, 2. that the partner has contracted a sexually transmitted disease from a third party 3. is engaging in sexual intercourse with a third party while the subject sleeps.

Causes

Psychological
There are many psychological causes that go along with morbid jealousy. Some people equate morbid jealousy with a delusional state. “Delusions of infidelity exist without any other psychopathology and may be considered to be morbid jealousy in its ‘purest’ form” (Kingham and Gordon). For morbid jealousy to occur one's memories are subconsciously changed and their partner's actions are misinterpreted as well to the extent that the person is absolutely convinced of betrayal from the partner. It is thought that even some brain disorders might eventually lead to delusions of betrayal. It has also been recorded by Cobb (1979) “that morbid jealousy may be present with all types of cerebral insult or injury.” "It has been suggested that morbid jealousy may potentially arise in response to reduced sexual function”. Cobb (1979) drew attention to the elderly man whose waning sexual powers were insufficient to satisfy a younger wife.

Mullen (1990) considered morbid jealousy to be associated with four features:
 An underlying mental disorder emerges before or with the jealousy
 The features of the underlying disorder coexist with the jealousy
 The course of morbid jealousy closely relates to that of the underlying disorder
 The jealousy has no basis in reality

Personality
People who are very insecure, or even fearful, are more likely to become anxious, or question their partner's commitment to them. “Insecure attachment style correlates strongly with borderline personality disorder” (Kingham and Gordon).

Environmental
Some people even believe that someone who is morbidly jealous might suspect that he or she is being drugged or given some kind of substance that might decrease their sexual potency, or they might even be under the impression that their significant other has somehow received a sexually transmitted disease from another person while the subject is unaware.

Epidemiology

There is no known prevalence of morbid jealousy; currently there is no community survey tracking its existence in individuals. As of late, it is considered to be a rare occurrence. Still, many counselors encounter cases of morbid jealousy. Some clinicians may never be able to treat this condition due to other dominating psychopathologies present within the jealous person that call for more attention.

Men and women differ dramatically when it comes to morbid jealousy. Men who suffer from morbid jealousy are more likely than women to use violence and also are more likely to harm or kill with their hands rather than a blunt object. Women on the other hand, when using violence, tend to use a blunt object or knife. Men focus on the rival's status and resources when it comes to the threat of jealousy they fear. Women tend to become more jealous of a potential threat on their rival's youth and physical attractiveness.

Triggers
For men the strongest trigger is sexual infidelity and with women the strongest trigger is emotional infidelity. If partner-related violence does not stop infidelity from happening, the male mate will sometimes resort to suicide instead. The final resort to stopping infidelity inside of morbid jealousy is to commit partner murder. Women are much less likely to kill their partner, unless it is in self-defense. Morbid jealousy can occur in a number of conditions such as chronic alcoholism, addiction to substances other than alcohol (i.e. cocaine, amphetamines.), organic brain disorders (i.e. Parkinson's, Huntington's), schizophrenia, neurosis, affective disturbances or personality disorders.

Associated drug and alcohol use
Alcohol and drug misuse has a well-recognized association with morbid jealousy. “In two studies, morbid jealousy was present in 27% and 34% respectively of men recruited from alcohol treatment services” (Shrestha et al., 1985; Michael et al., 1995). Amphetamine and cocaine increase the possibility of a delusion of infidelity that can continue after intoxication stops. (Shepherd, 1961).

Assessment

In an attempt to counsel or treat the morbid jealousy of an individual, proper and thorough assessment must be employed. This approach is broad in nature, but necessary so as to provide adequate information that will aid in the possible reparation of a dynamic containing a morbidly jealous person. To begin, a careful history should be taken of both partners if possible; separate and together. It is imperative that a full and detailed psychiatric history and mental state examination be recorded for the jealous partner; doing so may enable one to distinguish whether the jealousy is obsessional or delusional in nature. It is also possible that the jealousy may be the result of a thought that has been given too much importance. Considering that jealousy is a very delicate issue, any reference made to it should be approached carefully and with tact. It must be kept in mind that the jealous individual may be displacing blame for their issues onto their partner and their alleged infidelity as opposed to their own behavior. If there is any history of relevant or related mental illness and substance misuse it should be noted as it may possibly be a contributing or aiding factor. In order to get the best grasp on the issues and begin positive progression, multiple interviews should be held to assess the marital relationship.

After completing the assessment, it is best to deliver information about risk with both individuals in the relationship. Due to confidentiality, the patient should give consent for this information to be shared unless there is a risk to another individual and it is serious and immediate. This is the only case in which confidentiality is invalid. The professional should ensure that all necessary steps are taken to guarantee the safety of a potential victim, keeping in mind that it is possible that authorities may have to be alerted regarding the matter. If the professional has reason to believe that there is a high risk of harm to themselves or another person, the individual who is morbidly jealous should be admitted to hospital as soon as possible to prevent any negative outcomes for any parties involved.

Management
Morbid jealousy encompasses various psychiatric states and the best way to approach treatment depends on the symptoms that are observed in the individual. Therefore, prognosis and outcomes vary from person to person and depends on the situation and the complexities of the interpersonal relationships being observed. Also, other issues that may exacerbate the negative aspects of the environment created by jealous behavior need to be addressed in order to begin reparations. For example, if alcoholism plays a role in the behavior of the morbidly jealous individual, treatment of their addiction can positively affect their progress in trying to change their jealous nature. While psychotherapy can be an effective method of treating morbidly jealous persons, it is not sufficient when the nature of their illness is more serious. It is not possible to say that there is one form of treatment that is superior over all those that are currently available.  Even though this may be true, cognitive behavioral therapy is the treatment that has proven to be most effective.

Medical
Treatment of the primary psychiatric condition
Antipsychotic medication
Antidepressant medication
Psychological
Psycho education for the affected person and the partner
Behavioral therapy
Cognitive therapy
Individual psychotherapy
Insight oriented psychotherapies
Family therapy
Couple therapy
Social
Geographical separation of the partners
Social work involvement for child protection issues
Alcohol and substance misuse treatment

Risks associated

Confirmatory behaviors
When suspicions of the partner's fidelity arise, they quickly become all that is thought about. Certain behaviors, such as interrogation of the partner, repeated telephone calls to work and surprise visits, stalking behavior, setting up recording devices in the home or work, or hiring a private detective to follow the partner, are all common in trying to determine if there is truly infidelity or if it is just perceived. Individuals that are jealous may take drastic measures, such as searching the partner's clothing and belongings, look through diaries and other communication methods (email, text messaging), or examining bed sheets, undergarments and even genitalia for evidence of sexual activity.

Harm to self
Suicidal thoughts are common in morbid jealousy, especially because of its association with depression and substance abuse.

Risk to others
Violence can occur in any relationship tainted with jealousy, either normal or morbid jealousy. In a recent study of jealousy by Mullen & Martin in 1994, 15% of both men and women reported that at some time they had been “subjected to physical violence at the hands of a jealous partner.” Culturally, jealousy may be even used to “justify violence towards partners.” Victims in a homicide case are most likely to be current or ex-partners in both female and male perpetrators.
When a partner repeatedly denies infidelity, this may provoke anger and extreme violence. On the other hand, the partner that is suffering may give up and give a false confession, which in turn most likely will provoke rage in the jealous individual. In the U.S. a sample was taken of 20 participants with delusional jealousy. 19 were male and Silva (1998) found that 13 had threatened to kill their spouse because of their perceived infidelity. Of the 13 males, nine actually attacked their spouse. Out of the 20, a weapon was used by three of them, and 12 had harmed their spouse. 
A presence of paranoid delusions and hallucinations of injury to the spouse were most often associated with violence. This suggests that individuals that suffer from delusional jealousy that partake in violence may be solely driven by psychotic phenomena. A higher risk of assault was associated with alcohol consumption.

Risk to children
Children that live in a household with a parent that suffers from morbid jealousy may suffer emotional and/or physical abuse as a direct result of the actions made by the parent. Children may also accidentally overhear arguments or witness physical violence between their parents. They could even be potentially accidentally injured during assaults. The morbidly jealous parent may employ a child or more than one to spy on the other parent. It is not out of the question for a child to witness a homicide or suicide where their parent is the victim.

See also

References

Sources 
 Enoch, D. & Ball, H. (2001) The Othello Syndrome. In Enoch, D. & Ball, H. Uncommon psychiatric syndromes (fourth edition) pp50–73.  London: Arnold.

Further reading
 
 

Jealousy
Delusions